The FIBA EuroBasket MVP is the FIBA Europe honor that is bestowed upon the Most Valuable Player of each FIBA EuroBasket tournament. Pau Gasol and Krešimir Ćosić share the record for most EuroBasket MVP awards, with two each. Modestas Paulauskas is the youngest ever to get this award.

EuroBasket MVPs

Most times MVP 

Last update: after EuroBasket 2022

See also 
 FIBA EuroBasket
 FIBA EuroBasket Records
 FIBA EuroBasket Top Scorer
 FIBA EuroBasket All-Tournament Team
 FIBA World Cup
 FIBA World Cup Records
 FIBA World Cup MVP
 FIBA World Cup All-Tournament Team
 FIBA's 50 Greatest Players (1991)

References

External links 
 
 

MVP
European basketball awards
1935 establishments in Europe
Awards established in 1935
Basketball most valuable player awards